Mastophorus muris is a parasitic nematode in the genus Mastophorus. It infects animals such as the marsh rice rat (Oryzomys palustris), hispid cotton rat (Sigmodon hispidus), and singing vole (Microtus miurus).

See also 
 List of parasites of the marsh rice rat

References

Literature cited 
Cole, F.R. and Wilson, D.E. 2010. Microtus miurus (Rodentia: Cricetidae). Mammalian Species 42(855):75–89.
Kinsella, J.M. 1974. Comparison of helminth parasites of the cotton rat, Sigmodon hispidus, from several habitats in Florida. American Museum Novitates 2540:1–12.
Kinsella, J.M. 1988. Comparison of helminths of rice rats, Oryzomys palustris, from freshwater and saltwater marshes in Florida. Proceedings of the Helminthological Society of Washington 55(2):275–280.

Spirurida
Parasitic nematodes of mammals
Parasites of rodents
Nematodes described in 1790